Tim D. Seip (born May 25, 1969) is a former member of the Pennsylvania House of Representatives for the 125th legislative district. He was elected in 2006.

Seip graduated from Mansfield University with a degree in Criminal Justice Administration and Marywood University, with a master's in Social Work. Prior to elective office, he worked as a social worker at various locations.

On November 2, 2010, Seip was defeated for re-election by Republican Mike Tobash.

References

External links
Tim Seip For State House official campaign website

Living people
Members of the Pennsylvania House of Representatives
1969 births